Podocin is a protein that in humans is encoded by the NPHS2 gene.

Interactions 
NPHS2 has been shown to interact with Nephrin and CD2AP.

See also 
 Focal segmental glomerulosclerosis

References

Further reading